Henry Vivian may refer to:

Giff Vivian (Henry Gifford Vivian, 1912–1983), New Zealand cricketer
Henry Vivian, 1st Baron Swansea (1821–1894), Welsh industrialist and politician
Henry Vivian (trade unionist) (1868–1930), pioneer of UK co-partnership housing movement, politician & trade unionist

See also
John Henry Vivian (1785–1855), industrialist and politician